Samuel Matthews Vauclain (May 18, 1856 – February 4, 1940) was an American engineer, inventor of the Vauclain compound locomotive, and president of the Baldwin Locomotive Works.  He was awarded the John Scott Award and the Elliott Cresson Medal by The Franklin Institute in 1891. He was also awarded the Distinguished Service Medal for arming the United States Army during World War I.

Railroads
Vauclain served an apprenticeship in the machine shops of the Pennsylvania Railroad.  When he was 24, he was sent to inspect locomotives at the Baldwin Locomotive Works.  In those days, machining was a manual job with the machining done by hammers, files and chisels with the men's own hands. Vauclain's hands were left in a permanent clutching position from endless hours of chipping and filing metal. He became general foreman of Baldwin's 17th Street Shops in 1883, and quickly moved up through the company, as plant superintendent in 1886, then general superintendent.  He joined the board of directors in 1896, became vice-president in 1911, senior vice-president in 1917, president from 1919 to 1929, and chairman of the board from then until his death.  He was awarded the Elliott Cresson Medal by The Franklin Institute in 1891. At the same time, the Franklin Institute selected Vauclain for the John Scott Award funded by the City of Philadelphia.

He helped professor Thomas Garrigue Masaryk legions especially in Russia in 1918.

Personal life
Samuel Vauclain was born in Port Richmond, Philadelphia, Pennsylvania, the son of Andrew Constant Vauclain and Mary Ann Campbell Vauclain.  In 1879, he married Annie Kearney; they had six children.

Vauclain was a Republican, and served as a delegate from Pennsylvania's 7th District to the 1920 Republican National Convention, which nominated Warren G. Harding for president.

In 1923, he and several Baldwin officials took a trip around the Middle West in which he gave eight speeches in eight different cities.
Vauclain died following a heart attack, in Broadlawn, his home at Rosemont, Pennsylvania.

See also
 Baldwin Locomotive Works
 Vauclain compound
 Compound locomotive

References

External links
 Samuel M. Vauclain papers at the University of Texas
 TIME Magazine cover photo of Samuel M. Vauclain, April 21, 1923
 Photograph of Samuel Vauclain at the Library of Congress
 Samuel M. Vauclain in 20th Century American Leaders, Harvard Business School
 

1856 births
1940 deaths
Locomotive builders and designers
20th-century American railroad executives
American railroad mechanical engineers
Businesspeople from Philadelphia
Engineers from Pennsylvania